Prisoners of War is an album by rapper Sun Rise Above.

Track listing
Prelude/The Jump (2:34)
Break the Chain (3:29)
Prisoners of War (2:06)
Make a Move (3:26)
Dollar Bill (2:29)
Get a Job (1:18)
Grow (3:41)
Hang Over (3:00)
Time Is Now (2:36)
Free Your Mind (2:49)
Fuck the System (3:00)
Guerrilla Warfare (1:09)
Stop (3:08)
Epilogue (0:53)

References

2009 albums
Sun Rise Above albums